Kullihoma Grounds consists of  owned by the Chickasaw Nation, located  east of Ada, Oklahoma. The land was purchased in 1936, and the Chickasaw built replicas of historic tribal dwellings on the site and uses it as a stomp ground. Historically, Chickasaw housing consisted of summer and winter houses and corn cribs. The tribe also built a circular council house on the site. 

From Indian Removal to 1936, Chickasaw people held conducted an annual Green Corn Ceremony on this land.

Choctaw and Chickasaw people use the ground for cultural celebrations, such as stomp dances, stick ball tournaments, and the annual Chikasha Ittafama, or Chickasaw Reunion.  The game of chunkey, which had been played by Eastern Woodlands tribes and Plains tribes long before European and African contract, was reintroduced at the Chickasaw Reunion.

See also
Chunkey
Indigenous North American stickball
Stomp dance

Notes

References

External links
Kullihoma Information & Video, Chickasaw.TV

Chickasaw
Native American sports and games
Protected areas in Pontotoc County, Oklahoma
Protected areas established in 1936
Religion in Oklahoma